Baia County is one of the historic counties of Moldavia, Romania. The county seat was Fălticeni.

In 1938, the county was disestablished and incorporated into the newly formed Ținutul Prut, but it was re-established in 1940 after the fall of Carol II's regime - only to be abolished 10 years later by the Communist regime.

Geography
Baia County covered 3,353 km2 and was located in Moldavia. Currently, the territory that comprised Baia County is now included in the Suceava County, Iași County and Neamț County. In the interwar period, the county neighbored Câmpulung and Suceava counties to the north, Botoșani  to the northeast, Iași to the east, Roman to the south, and Neamț counties to the west.

Administrative organization
Administratively, Baia County was originally divided into three districts (plăși): 
 Plasa Moldova, headquartered at Baia
 Plasa Pașcani, headquartered at Pașcani
 Plasa Siret, headquartered at Lespezi

Subsequently, Plasa Moldova district was divided into two new districts:
Plasa Boroaia, headquartered at Boroaia
Plasa Mălini, headquartered at Mălini

Population 
According to the 1930 census data, the county population was 157,501 inhabitants, consisting of 91.8% Romanians, 4.8% Jews, 1.2% Romanies, 0.6% Germans, as well as other minorities. As a mother tongue 93.5% spoke Romanian, 3.7% Yiddish, 0.7% Romany, 0.6% German, as well as other minorities. From a religious point of view, the population consisted of 92.9% Eastern Orthodox, 4.9% Jewish, 1.0% Roman Catholic, as well as other minorities.

Urban population 
In 1930, the county's urban population was ethnically 76.6% Romanian, 19.7% Jewish, 1.3% German, as well as other minorities. From the religious point of view, the urban population had the following structure: 76.5% Eastern Orthodox, 20.3% Jewish, 2.4% Roman Catholic, as well as other minorities.

Gallery

References

External links

  Baia County on memoria.ro

Former counties of Romania
1925 establishments in Romania
1938 disestablishments in Romania
1940 establishments in Romania
1950 disestablishments in Romania
States and territories established in 1925
States and territories disestablished in 1938
States and territories established in 1940
States and territories disestablished in 1950